Ivan Bebek (born 30 May 1977) is a Croatian football referee. He lives in Rijeka.

Bebek is the only Croatian referee to have supervised three UEFA Champions League group stage matches (Lazio v. Werder Bremen during the 2007–08 season, Bordeaux v. CFR Cluj in the 2008–09 season and Copenhagen v. Juventus during the 2013–14 season). He also refereed at the 2013–14 UEFA Champions League knockout stage (Paris Saint-Germain v. Bayer Leverkusen).

He has refereed at the 2007 FIFA U-17 World Cup. He was also a fourth official at UEFA Euro 2008. He refereed at the 2009 FIFA U-20 World Cup and invited to Indian League.

He was preselected as a referee for the 2010 FIFA World Cup.

Criticism 
On March 17, 2016; Bebek, who refereed the 2015-16 UEFA Europa League match between SC Braga and Fenerbahçe at the Braga Municipal Stadium, received intense criticism by showing Fenerbahçe team three red cards and eight yellow cards. At the end of the match, SC Braga won 4-1 and advanced to the quarter-finals. After the match, Fenerbahçe claimed "bet manipulation" and requested UEFA to investigate Ivan Bebek's phone traffic and assets. After evaluating the complaint, the UEFA Referees Committee dropped Bebek to the first category, who was in the elite referee group until 12 June 2016.

On October 7, 2021; the Disciplinary Commission of the Croatian association decided to suspend the referee for a period of four months. This decision was due to his conversations that leaked in the media, in which he insults Hajduk Split fans, with Croatian journalist Blaž Duplančic.

His father Veselko Bebek, a former referee and federation manager, is also known by the bribe of 25.000 Euros he took before getting suspended.

On November 1, 2022; Bebek was assigned as the fourth official for the UEFA Europa League match between Dinamo Kyiv and Fenerbahçe. Hours after the announcement, he was changed with Marin Vidulin.

See also
 List of football referees

References

External links
 Profile at weltfussball.de 
FIFA Profile

1977 births
Living people
Croatian football referees
Sportspeople from Rijeka